The Dominion Hotel is a restaurant and former hotel in Toronto, Ontario, Canada. Constructed in the late nineteenth century in the Corktown neighbourhood, it is a heritage hotel structure that has not been torn down and replaced with a modern structure. The structure is a designated heritage property.

The hotel was constructed in 1889. Its first owner was Robert T. Davies, who founded the Dominion Brewery to the west of the building (now Dominion Square) in 1877. Davies had previously been the manager of the nearby Don Brewery, owned by his relative Thomas Davies.

As originally constructed, the hotel was four stories tall, had a mansard roof, and a small tower.
The top floor, once "boasted an elegant performance space". Sometime after 1945, the structure lost its fourth floor, mansard roof and tower. The hotel re-opened in 1998 as a bar.

The bar closed in 2014 for renovation work. In mid-2015, FAB Restaurant Concepts purchased the bar and on November 31, 2015 it was re-opened as the Dominion Pub & Kitchen. The upper floors are used as a rooming house of 25 units.

References

External links

Dominion Pub and Kitchen

Hotels in Toronto
Hotel buildings completed in 1889
1889 establishments in Ontario